Dysgnathia is a genus of moths of the family Noctuidae. The genus was described by Warren in 1913.

Species
Dysgnathia albolineata (Bethune-Baker, 1906) New Guinea
Dysgnathia mediopallens (Bethune-Baker, 1906) New Guinea
Dysgnathia nigropunctata (Bethune-Baker, 1906) New Guinea, South Africa, Zimbabwe

References

Acontiinae